Sky Cruiser may refer to:
Bilsam Sky Cruiser, a Polish aircraft design
Sky Cruiser, an EP by the American band Ween